The greater yellowlegs (Tringa melanoleuca) is a large shorebird in the family Scolopacidae. It breeds in central Canada and southern Alaska and winters in southern North America, Central America, the West Indies and South America.

Taxonomy
The greater yellowlegs was formally described in 1789 by the German naturalist Johann Friedrich Gmelin in his revised and expanded edition of Carl Linnaeus's Systema Naturae. He placed it in the genus Scolopax and coined the binomial name Scolopax melanoleuca. Gmelin based his description on the "stone snipe" seen feeding in autumn in Chateau Bay, Labrador, that had been described in 1785 by both the English ornithologist John Latham and by the Welsh naturalist Thomas Pennant. The greater yellowlegs is now placed in the genus Tringa that was introduced in 1758 by the Swedish naturalist Carl Linnaeus in the tenth edition of his Systema Naturae. The name Tringa is the New Latin word given to the green sandpiper by the Italian naturalist Ulisse Aldrovandi in 1603 based on Ancient Greek trungas, a thrush-sized, white-rumped, tail-bobbing wading bird mentioned by Aristotle.  The specific epithet melanoleuca combines the Ancient Greek melas meaning "yellow" with leucos meaning "white". The species is monotypic: no subspecies are recognised.

Description
The greater yellowlegs is similar in appearance to the smaller lesser yellowlegs. Its closest relative, however, is the greenshank, which together with the spotted redshank form a close-knit group. Among them, these three species show all the basic leg and foot colors found in the shanks, demonstrating that this character is paraphyletic. They are also the largest shanks apart from the willet, which is altogether more robustly built. The greater yellowlegs and the greenshank share a coarse, dark, and fairly crisp breast pattern as well as much black on the shoulders and back in breeding plumage.

Adults have long yellow legs and a long, thin, dark bill which has a slight upward curve and is longer than the head. The body is grey-brown on top and white underneath; the neck and breast are streaked with dark brown. The rump is white. Wingspan is 23.6 in (60 cm).

The call is harsher, louder, and clearer than that of the lesser yellowlegs. They have a three-syllable whistle when flight-calling, with a lower pitched third syllable.

Distribution and habitat
Their breeding habitat is bogs and marshes in the boreal forest region of Canada and Alaska. They migrate to the Atlantic and Pacific coasts of the United States, the Caribbean, and south to South America. They are very rare vagrants to western Europe.

Behavior and ecology

Breeding
They nest on the ground, usually in well-hidden locations near water. The incubation period is 23 days. The young leave the nest within 24 hours of hatching and then leave the vicinity of the nest within two days.

Food and feeding

These birds forage in shallow water, sometimes using their bills to stir up the water. They mainly eat insects and small fish, as well as crustaceans, marine worms, frogs, seeds and berries.

References

greater yellowlegs
Native birds of Alaska
Birds of Canada
Birds of Hispaniola
Birds of the Dominican Republic
Birds of South America
greater yellowlegs
greater yellowlegs